The Aeromonadaceae are Gram-negative bacteria. The species are facultative anaerobic organisms. The cells are rod-shaped. They are mostly found in estuarine waters and fresh water, also in soil and sewage. Some are pathogenic for humans and other animals such as fishes and frogs.

References

Aeromonadales